All Day Long is a jazz album by the Prestige All Stars, later credited to trumpeter Donald Byrd and guitarist Kenny Burrell, released in 1957 on the Prestige label. This was one of the first albums in which Burrell was presented as a leader. It's characterized by up tempo pieces, all of which were composed by the members of the band.

Side A of the LP only included the blues "All Day Long" described by Dan Morgenstern as "A simple but effective structure" that "controls the performance and keeps it solidly together: each soloist enters with a break, plays 12 bars, and then breaks again before extemporizing at great length". 
Ira Gitler in the original liner notes points out that the theme "A.T." is dedicated by Frank Foster to Art Taylor (hence the initials); "Say Listen" "derives its name from the attention calling phrase that (Byrd) often verbally employed".

Album design
The cover of the original album in 1957 and of the CD reissue in 1990 show two photographs of the George Washington Bridge in New York connecting Manhattan to New Jersey, taken in the daytime and by night.

Track listing

(*)Note:
Track 5 was not part of original vinyl and was initially issued on the LP compilation The Best of Kenny Burrell (Prestige 1966). This is an additional track included in the CD version of 1990, digitally remastered by the engineer Phil De Lancie at Fantasy Studios in Berkeley (California).

Personnel
Kenny Burrell – guitar
Donald Byrd – trumpet
Frank Foster – tenor sax
Tommy Flanagan – piano
Doug Watkins – bass
Arthur Taylor – drums

References 

1957 albums
Prestige Records albums
Kenny Burrell albums
Albums produced by Bob Weinstock
Albums recorded at Van Gelder Studio